Orinoca is a small town in the Bolivian Oruro Department.

Orinoca has 163 inhabitants (2001) and is the administrative center of Orinoca District. The second-largest lake in Bolivia was dried up as of December 2015, except for a few marshy patches, and officials do not know if it can recover from an extended drought.

Orinoca is accessible by road, and a bus service that serves the town twice a week.

The village of Isallavi in the Orinoca District is the birthplace of Evo Morales, the President of Bolivia from 2006 to 2019.

References

External links
Detailed province map

Populated places in Oruro Department